RGH may refer to:

 Royal Gloucestershire Hussars, a former British Army Regiment
 RGH-188, an antipsychotic drug
 Repatriation General Hospital, a group of Australian hospitals, mostly active between 1947 and 1995
 RGH UMC, Riverside General Hospital University Medical Center in California
 Rockyview General Hospital, in Calgary, Alberta, Canada
 Raleigh (Amtrak station), station code RGH
 Reset Glitch Hack, a way to modify an Xbox 360 game console
Royal Gwent Hospital, Hospital in Newport South Wales
Rabbids Go Home, a 2009 video game released for Nintendo DS and Wii